Boys Town is a small village near Mananthavady in Wayanad, Kerala, India. The village is 13 km from Mananthavady.

Scenic beauty
The village attracts many visitors because of the undulating tea plantations in this area.  Most of the tourists are day trippers as there are no hotels here.  Only one tea-shop is available at the Boys Town Junction.

Tourist attractions
 Herbal Garden
 Nature Care center
 Seri culture center
 Perma culture center
 Gene Park (Indo-Danish Project)

Transportation
Boys town can be accessed from Mananthavady town. The Periya ghat road connects Mananthavady to Kannur and Thalassery.  The Thamarassery mountain road connects Calicut with Kalpetta. The Kuttiady mountain road connects Vatakara with Kalpetta and Mananthavady. The Palchuram mountain road connects Kannur and Iritty with Mananthavady.  The road from Nilambur to Ooty is also connected to Wayanad through the village of Meppadi.

The nearest railway station is at vadakara  and the nearest airports are Kannur International Airport- 58 km, Kozhikode International Airport-120 km and Bengaluru International Airport-290 km.

Image gallery

See also
 Thavinjal
 Thalappuzha
 Palchuram

References

External links 
 

Mananthavady Area
Villages in Wayanad district